Euphorbia rigida, the gopher spurge or upright myrtle spurge, is a species of flowering plant in the spurge family Euphorbiaceae, native to southern Europe and southwest Asia.

In its native Mediterranean Basin and the Middle East it is considered a weed. It has appeared spontaneously in the California wilderness but is not considered a noxious weed.

Gardening
This plant is commonly used as an ornamental in temperate gardens of Europe and North America, where it is valued as a relatively trouble-free specimen for drought-resistant and low-maintenance situations. It is especially useful for underplanting larger shrubs such as roses. It performs best in well-drained soil in the sun or light shade. It has gained the Royal Horticultural Society’s Award of Garden Merit.

Toxicity
As with others of the genus, all parts of the plant are toxic if eaten. When cut or broken, the wounds leak a milky sap which can cause skin irritation.

Biofuels
Research has been done on using Euphorbia rigida as a bio fuel. It has been shown to produce 137 gallons of oil per acre.

References

rigida